Graphocephala is a large genus of leafhoppers, found from southern Canada to northern South America.

Species

References

Cicadellini
Cicadellidae genera
Hemiptera of North America
Insects of South America
Taxa named by Edward Payson Van Duzee